Nemastomatinae is a subfamily of harvestmen with 123 described species in 18 genera.

Species 
The following species are included in Nemastomatinae:

Acromitostoma Roewer, 1951

 Acromitostoma hispanum (Roewer, 1917)
 Acromitostoma rhinoceros (Roewer, 1917)

 Carinostoma Kratochvíl, 1958

 Carinostoma carinatum (Roewer, 1914)
 Carinostoma elegans (Sørensen, 1894)
 Carinostoma ornatum (Hadži, 1940)

 Caucnemastoma Martens, 2006

 Caucnemastoma golovatchi Martens, 2006
 Caucnemastoma martensi Snegovaya, 2011

 Centetostoma Kratochvíl, 1958

 Centetostoma centetes (Simon, 1881)
 Centetostoma juberthiei Martens, 2011
 Centetostoma scabriculum (Simon, 1879)
 Centetostoma ventalloi (Mello-Leitao, 1936)

 Giljarovia Kratochvíl, 1958

 Giljarovia crimeana Chemeris & Kovblyuk, 2012
 Giljarovia kratochvili Snegovaya, 2011
 Giljarovia redikorzevi Charitonov, 1946
 Giljarovia rossica Kratochvíl, 1958
 Giljarovia stridula (Kratochvíl, 1958)
 Giljarovia tenebricosa (Redikortsev, 1936)
 Giljarovia thoracocornuta Martens, 2006
 Giljarovia triangula Martens, 2006
 Giljarovia trianguloides Martens, 2006
 Giljarovia turica Gruber, 1976
 Giljarovia vestita Martens, 2006

 Hadzinia Šilhavý, 1966

 Hadzinia ferrani Novak & Kozel, 2014
 Hadzinia karamani (Hadži, 1940)

 Histricostoma Kratochvíl, 1958

 Histrocostoma anatolicum (Roewer, 1962)
 Histricostoma argenteolunulatum (Canestrini, 1875)
 Histricostoma caucasicum (Redikortsev, 1936)
 Histricostoma creticum (Roewer, 1927)
 Histricostoma dentipalpe (Ausserer, 1867)
 Histricostoma drenskii Kratochvíl, 1958
 Histricostoma gruberi Snegovaya & Marusik, 2012
 Histricostoma mitovi Snegovaya & Marusik, 2012

 Mediostoma Kratochvíl, 1958

 Mediostoma armatum Martens, 2006
 Mediostoma ceratocephalum Gruber, 1976
 Mediostoma cypricum (Roewer, 1951)
 Mediostoma globuliferum (L. Koch, 1867)
 Mediostoma haasi (Roewer, 1953)
 Mediostoma humerale (C.L. Koch, 1839)
 Mediostoma izmirica Snegovaya, 2016
 Mediostoma nigrum Martens, 2006
 Mediostoma pamiricum Staręga, 1986
 Mediostoma stussineri (Simon, 1885)
 Mediostoma variabile Martens, 2006
 Mediostoma vityae (Roewer, 1927)

 Mitostoma Roewer, 1951

 Mitostoma alpinum (Hadži, 1931)
 Mitostoma anophthalmum (Fage, 1946)
 Mitostoma atticum (Roewer, 1927)
 Mitostoma cancellatum (Roewer, 1917)
 Mitostoma carneluttii Hadži, 1973
 Mitostoma chrysomelas (Hermann, 1804)
 Mitostoma daccordii Tedeschi & Sciaky, 1997
 Mitostoma fabianae Tedescie & Sciaky, 1997
 Mitostoma gracile (Redikortsev, 1936)
 Mitostoma macedonicum Hadži, 1973
 Mitostoma olgae (Šilhavý, 1939)
 Mitostoma olgae olgae (Šilhavý, 1939)
 Mitostoma olgae decorum (Šilhavý, 1939)
 Mitostoma olgae kratochvili (Šilhavý, 1939)
 Mitostoma olgae zorae Hadži, 1973
 Mitostoma orobicum (Caporiacco, 1949)
 Mitostoma patrizii Roewer, 1953
 Mitostoma pyrenaeum (Simon, 1879)
 Mitostoma sabbadinii Tedeschi & Sciaky
 Mitostoma valdemonense Marcellino, 1974
 Mitostoma zmajevicae Hadži, 1973

 Nemaspela Šilhavý, 1966

 Nemaspela abchasica (Ljovuschkin & Starobogatov, 1963)
 Nemaspela birsteini Ljovuschkin, 1972
 Nemaspela caeca (Grese, 1911)
 Nemaspela femorecurvata Martens, 2006
 Nemaspela gagrica Chemeris, 2013
 Nemaspela kovali Chemeris, 2009
 Nemaspela ladae Karaman, 2013
 Nemaspela sokolovi (Ljovuschkin & Starobogatov, 1963)
 Nemaspela taurica (Lebedinski, 1914)

 Nemastoma (C.L. Koch, 1836)
 Nemastoma bidentatum Roewer, 1914
 Nemastoma bidentatum bidentatum Roewer, 1914
 Nemastoma bidentatum pluridentatum Hadži, 1973
 Nemastoma bidentatum sparsum Gruber & Martens, 1968
 Nemastoma bidentatum relictum Gruber & Martens, 1968
 Nemastoma bimaculatum (Fabricius, 1775)
 Nemastoma dentigerum Canestrini, 1873
 Nemastoma lugubre (Müller, 1776)
 Nemastoma schuelleri Gruber & Martens
 Nemastoma transsylvanicum Gruber & Martens, 1968
 Nemastoma triste (C.L. Koch, 1835)

 Nemastomella Mello-Leitão, 1936
 Nemastomella armatissima (Roewer, 1962)
 Nemastomella bacillifera (Simon, 1879)
 Nemastomella bacillifera bacillifera (Simon, 1879)
 Nemastomella bacillifera carbonaria (Simon, 1907)
 Nemastomella cristinae (Rambla, 1969)
 Nemastomella dentipatellae (Dresco, 1967)
 Nemastomella dipentata (Rambla, 1959)
 Nemastomella dubia (Mello-Leitão, 1936)
 Nemastomella gevia Prieto, 2004
 Nemastomella hankiewiczii (Kulczyński, 1909)
 Nemastomella iberica (Rambla in Dresco, 1967)
 Nemastomella maarebensis (Simon, 1913)
 Nemastomella manicata (Simon, 1913)
 Nemastomella monchiquensis (Kraus, 1961)
 Nemastomella sexmucronata (Simon, 1911)
 Nemastomella spinosissima (Kraus, 1961)

 Paranemastoma Redikorzev, 1936
 Paranemastoma ancae Avram, 1973
 Paranemastoma armatum (Kulczyński, 1909)
 Paranemastoma aurigerum (Roewer, 1951)
 Paranemastoma aurigerum aurigerum (Roewer, 1951)
 Paranemastoma aurigerum ryla (Roewer, 1951)
 Paranemastoma aurigerum joannae Staręga, 1976
 Paranemastoma aurosum (L. Koch, 1869)
 Paranemastoma beroni Mitov, 2011
 Paranemastoma bicuspidatum (C.L. Koch, 1835)
 Paranemastoma bureschi (Roewer, 1926)
 Paranemastoma corcyraeum (Roewer, 1917)
 Paranemastoma filipes (Roewer, 1917)
 Paranemastoma iranicum Martens, 2006
 Paranemastoma kalischevskyi (Roewer, 1951)
 Paranemastoma kochii (Nowicki, 1870)
 Paranemastoma longipes (Schenkel, 1947)
 Paranemastoma quadripunctatum (Perty, 1833)
 Paranemastoma radewi (Roewer, 1926)
 Paranemastoma sillii (Herman, 1871)
 Paranemastoma sillii sillii (Herman, 1871)
 Paranemastoma sillii monticola Babalean, 2011
 Paranemastoma simplex (Giltay, 1932)
 Paranemastoma superbum Redikorzev, 1936
 Paranemastoma thessalum (Simon, 1885)
 Paranemastoma titaniacum (Roewer, 1914)
 Paranemastoma werneri (Kulczyński, 1903)

 Pyza Staręga, 1976
 Pyza anatolica (Roewer, 1959)
 Pyza bosnica (Roewer, 1917)
 Pyza navarrense (Roewer, 1951)
 Pyza taurica Gruber, 1979

 Saccarella Schönhofer & Martens, 2012
 Saccarella schilleri Schönhofer & Martens, 2012

 Sinostoma Martens, 2016
 Sinostoma yunnanicum Martens, 2016

 Starengovia Snegovaya, 2010
 Starengovia kirgizica Snegovaya, 2010
 Starengovia ivanloebli Martens, 2017
 Starengovia quadrituberculata Zhang & Martens, 2018

 Vestiferum Martens, 2006
 Vestiferum alatum Martens, 2006
 Vestiferum funebre (Redikorzev, 1936)

Fossil species
There are currently 5 described fossil harvestmen that have been assigned to Nemastomatinae, 4 of which are assigned to modern genera:

 Histricostoma Kratochvíl, 1958
 † Histricostoma tuberculatum (C.L. Koch & Berendt, 1854) - Paleogene Baltic & Bitterfield amber
 Mitostoma Roewer, 1951
 † Mitostoma denticulatum (C.L. Koch & Berendt, 1854) - Paleogene Baltic amber
 † Mitostoma gruberi Dunlop & Mitov, 2009 - Paleogene Baltic & Bitterfield amber
 Nemastoma (C.L. Koch, 1836)
 † Nemastoma incertum C.L. Koch & Berendt, 1854 - Paleogene Baltic amber
 † Paragilarovia Elsaka, Mitov, & Dunlop, 2019
 † Paragilarovia hochae Elsaka, Mitov, & Dunlop, 2019 - Paleogene Baltic amber

References 

Harvestmen
Arthropod subfamilies